The Texas derby is a soccer rivalry (derby) between the Houston Dynamo FC and FC Dallas, recognizing the best club in the state for the season until 2021 when Austin FC joined MLS. The two squads play a series of games with the series winner taking home El Capitán, a replica 18th century mountain howitzer cannon. Through the 2022 season, FC Dallas leads the series, 9–8.

The Houston Dynamo clinched the 2006 series with a win on August 12, 2006, and the 2007 series with a win on August 19, 2007. FC Dallas claimed the 2008 series on the away goals rule, after having tied with Dynamo in all three games played that season. The away goals rule is no longer used as a tiebreaker.

Both the 2016 and 2017 series were tied, the first since 2008 and the first since the tiebreaker rules were changed. Houston won the 2016 series on goal differential. The tiebreakers couldn't separate the teams in 2017 so Houston retained El Capitán. Dallas won the 2019 series on goal differential.

Tiebreakers 

Only MLS regular season matches are used to determine the winner of El Capitán, unless the season series is tied. If the series is tied, the tiebreakers are as follows:

Series results

El Capitán winners

All-time record

Game history

Top scorers

Bold indicates a player who is still on a FC Dallas or Houston Dynamo roster.

Clean sheets

Bold indicates a player who is still on a FC Dallas or Houston Dynamo roster.

Players who have played for both clubs

Attendances 
Top 5 most-attended Houston home Texas derbies
 Houston 4–1 (aet) Dallas; 30,088 (November 2, 2007) Robertson Stadium
 Houston 1–4 Dallas; 22,202 (April 5, 2014) BBVA Compass Stadium
 Houston 1–1 Dallas; 22,115 (June 23, 2017) BBVA Compass Stadium
 Houston 2–1 Dallas; 22,039 (June 16, 2012) BBVA Compass Stadium
 Houston 5–0 Dallas; 21,601 (March 12, 2016) BBVA Compass Stadium 
Top 5 least-attended Houston home Texas derbies
 Houston 0–0 Dallas; 0 (August 21, 2020) BBVA Stadium 
 Houston 2–0 Dallas; 1,582 (October 7, 2020) BBVA Stadium 
 Houston 2–3 (aet) Dallas; 2,083 (June 24, 2014) BBVA Compass Stadium 
 Houston 3–0 Dallas; 4,000 (August 8, 2006) Carl Lewis Track and Field Stadium 
 Houston 0–1 Dallas; 10,150 (July 20, 2016) BBVA Compass Stadium 
Top 5 most-attended Dallas home Texas derbies
 Dallas 0–3 Houston; 17,366 (September 30, 2007) Pizza Hut Park
 Dallas 4–2 Houston; 16,835 (September 1, 2018) Toyota Stadium
 Dallas 2–1 Houston; 15,792 (April 23, 2022) Toyota Stadium
 Dallas 3–2 Houston; 15,623 (March 17, 2013) FC Dallas Stadium
 Dallas 5–1 Houston; 15,452 (August 25, 2019) Toyota Stadium
Top 5 least-attended Dallas home Texas derbies
 Dallas 2–1 Houston; 222 (September 12, 2020) Toyota Stadium 
 Dallas 3–0 Houston; 4,000 (June 12, 2013) FC Dallas Stadium 
 Dallas 3–0 Houston; 4,028 (October 31, 2020) Toyota Stadium 
 Dallas 1–0 Houston; 7,442 (August 6, 2009) Pizza Hut Park
 Dallas 1–1 Houston; 8,018 (March 27, 2010) Pizza Hut Park

Honors

See also
Lone Star Series (MLB)
Governor's Cup (Texas) (NFL)
Mavericks-Rockets Rivalry
Copa Tejas

Notes

References

External links
Article about El Capitán
Rule changes for 2009 edition

Sports in Houston
Sports in the Dallas–Fort Worth metroplex
Major League Soccer rivalries
Houston Dynamo FC
FC Dallas
Soccer in Texas
2006 establishments in Texas